The 1874 United States House of Representatives elections in Florida were held on November 3 for the 44th Congress.

Background
Florida gained a second seat after the 1870 census, but in 1872, both seats were elected at large.  In 1874, Florida was divided, for the first time, into districts for the United States House of Representatives.

Election results

1st District

Results

2nd District

Results

Contested election

On April 19, 1876, Finley was declared the winner of the election in the 2nd district and was seated in Congress.

Results

See also
United States House of Representatives elections, 1874

References

1874
Florida
United States House of Representatives